United World College of the Adriatic (UWC Adriatic or UWCAd ) is a part of the United World Colleges, a global educational movement that brings together students from all over the world with the aim to foster peace and international understanding. The school is attended by around 200 mixed-gender students aged between 16 and 19, mostly on full scholarship, from around 90 countries of the world, who study the International Baccalaureate Diploma Programme, a two-year internationally recognized pre-university program.

The school is hosted in the village of Duino, between Trieste and Monfalcone, in north-eastern Italy in the region of Friuli Venezia Giulia, less than 5 km from the Slovenian border.  It was founded in 1982, by the region of Friuli Venezia Giulia, with the support of the Italian government (Ministry of Foreign Affairs), who are still the major financial supporters of the college. The founding headmaster of the college was David B. Sutcliffe, an influential part of the United World Colleges's movement and follower of the Kurt Hahn educational philosophy.

Students and staff
The students of UWCAd are selected by UWC national selection committees in their home countries on the basis of academic achievement, leadership potential, extracurricular activities involvement and personal qualities. The students selected are awarded a full scholarship.
The Italian National Committee for United World Colleges acts under the patronage of the President of the Italian Republic and is responsible for communication with the international organisation and for the selection of Italian pupils.

As an example, in academic year 2011–12, the school hosted 184 students, of which approximately 15% were Italian, 15% came from elsewhere in Western Europe, 20% from Eastern Europe, 15% from the Americas, 15% from Africa and the Middle East and 20% from Asia and Oceania.

Teachers are also hired internationally. Apart from being responsible for classroom teaching they act as personal tutors for a group of students and contribute to the residential nature of the college and the running of activities and services. Since August 2022, the Rettore (headmaster) has been Khalid El-Metaal, who was previously the deputy head at the Toronto French School in Canada, and served as Deputy Headteacher at the Modern English School of Cairo.

Life at UWCAd
UWCAd, following the ideals of German educator Kurt Hahn, founder of the UWC movement, believes in a holistic approach to education which makes personal development of the student central. Courses at the college are taught in English. However, students are not selected on the basis of their ability to speak English (e.g. the Italian National Committee does not consider knowledge of English a prerequisite for application.)

In addition to the academic requirements of the IB, the college places importance on the Creativity Action Service (CAS) requirement, which means that each student is required to commit to one creative activity, one physical activity and one social service.

As a deviation to the general requirements of the IB, all students at the college are required to study Italian. The subject "World Arts and Cultures" has been developed in the college by Prof. Henry Thomas, initially as a school based syllabus, and is now taught by IB schools in several countries.
The college also collaborates with the Scuola Trio di Trieste, which offers professional musical education. To foster excellence in music the college used to accept 5 students a year under a special music scholarship. The practice was recently discontinued in academic year 2009–10 in an attempt to standardize admission procedures .

The UWCAd additionally offers various physical activities program taking advantage out of the location of the college, close to the Alps and the Adriatic Sea, thus including activities such a cross-country and downhill skiing, hiking, kayaking, caving, and sailing. The creative activities program offers a wide variety of choices, ranging from drama to art, pottery, choir, and photography.

Students at UWCAd also take part in a variety of initiatives that go beyond the IB curriculum
 Project Weeks. One week a year where students plan and carry out own project and write a report about it
 International Affairs and Focus. Lectures and presentations involving a speaker series, encompassing academics and international organization professionals, poets, writers and journalists, politicians, diplomats, NGO workers and scientists.
 National Weeks. Period of time during the academic year where students who belong to certain national and linguistic groups present their culture to other members of college.
 International Shows. Several times during the year students give shows consisting of dance, music and sketches. Shows might be organized to support a charity.
 Cultural Visits. Students go on field trips to visit many cultural and artistic sites in nearby places such as Venice, Aquileia, Rome, Vienna, Ravenna, Ljubljana, Mantua and Bologna. Some visits are incorporated into the coursework of the World Cultures subject taught at the college. 
 Choir. Students visit nearby sites to perform a wide repertoire of songs by the college choir.
 Artistic concerts. The college boasts many musician students who often perform concerts that nearby residents can attend.

College and facilities

The college does not have a closed campus, rather it is integrated in the village of Duino. Students live in residences that are spread over the village, the smallest houses 6 students, and the largest just over 50. The largest residence, the Foresteria is part of the complex of the Duino castle.

Other

Students at the college are eligible, after graduation, to participate in the Shelby Davis Scholarship program, which funds undergraduate study, based on need, for UWC students at over 90 universities in the United States, including most Ivy League universities.

Notable alumni

 Lina Attalah (born 1983), Egyptian media figure and journalist.
 Marina Catena (born 1968), Italian UN official.
 Juan Pablo Di Pace (born 1979), Argentinian actor.
 Alberto Díaz-Cayeros, Stanford Professor of Political Science.
 Corinne Ellemeet (born 1976), Dutch politician, member of the House of Representatives.
 Chrystia Freeland (born 1968),  Former Canadian Minister of Foreign Affairs, Member of the Canadian Parliament and former Thomson Reuters managing director. First female Canadian Minister of Finance and current (as of 2021) deputy Prime Minister of Canada.
 Barbara Graziosi, Princeton professor of Classics.
 Sophie Hawley-Weld (born 1992), German singer, part of Sofi Tukker.
 Darren Huston (born 1966), Canadian businessman, CEO of the Priceline Group and booking.com
 Karen Mok (born 1970), Hong Kong singer.
 Jason Y. Ng (born 1972), Hong Kong-Canadian author and activist. 
 Joseph Pearson (writer) (born 1975), Canadian/Italian author.
 Tara Sharma (born 1977), British-Indian actress.
 Guglielmo Verdirame (born 1974), Italian Lawyer and Professor of International Law at King's College London
 Ghil'ad Zuckermann (born 1971), Israeli linguist.

References

External links

 UWCAd Official Site
 Sito della Commissione Nazionale Italiana per i Collegi del Mondo Unito 
 У міжнародныя каледжы прыняты новыя навучэнцы з Беларусі // 2009.05.02 (Be)

Schools in Friuli-Venezia Giulia
International schools in Italy
International Baccalaureate schools in Italy